"I Could" is the fourth single from American Idol finalist, Kimberley Locke, and final single from her One Love album. The single was released strictly to radio and was not released as a commercial CD single. "I Could" is the first of Kimberley's singles to not have an accompanying music video.

Charts

2005 singles
Kimberley Locke songs
2005 songs
Songs written by Dan Muckala
Curb Records singles
Songs written by Kari Kimmel